Stop the New Sex-Ed Agenda is a minor social conservative provincial political party in Ontario, Canada. It was founded by Queenie Yu, who also serves as its leader. It is a single issue party with a platform based on being in opposition to the updated sexual education curriculum for Ontario public schools implemented in 2015. Yu has stated on multiple occasions that the goal of the party is not to win seats but rather to encourage others to oppose the curriculum.

History
Prior to the foundation of the party, Queenie Yu ran as an independent candidate in the September 1, 2016 byelection in Scarborough—Rouge River, coming in fourth with 582 votes.

Yu and other protesters opposed to the Ontario government's February 2015 update of the Ontario sex education curriculum founded the party in October 2016. It ran one candidate each in the 2016 by-elections in Ottawa—Vanier and Niagara West—Glanbrook. In the 2018 Ontario general election, the party ran a total of three candidates, none of which won their seats.

The party failed to win any seats in the 2022 Ontario general election.

Election results

References

Provincial political parties in Ontario
2016 establishments in Ontario
Conservative parties in Canada
Social conservative parties
Single-issue political parties
Opposition to sex education
Organizations that oppose LGBT rights
Political parties established in 2016
Organizations based in Toronto